Moss Rose, known as The Leasing.com Stadium for sponsorship reasons, is a football stadium in Macclesfield, Cheshire, England, which is the home ground of Macclesfield F.C., and the former home of Macclesfield Town, a club wound up in September 2020. The capacity is currently restricted to 4,720 by Cheshire East Council. It was built in 1891, making it one of the oldest grounds in England.

History
Moss Rose first hosted Football League action when Chester City played home games at the stadium, between moving from Sealand Road to the Deva Stadium, from 1990 to 1992. The first such match was a 2–1 win for Exeter City on 1 September 1990. Later in the month, Arsenal played at Moss Rose in a Football League Cup tie, winning 1–0. Macclesfield Town was a non-league side at the time and fixtures were arranged so Chester were at home when Macclesfield Town were away and vice versa. The Moss Rose pitch was having to contend with more than 50 first-team matches a season from the two sides.

Despite hosting Football League matches in this period, Macclesfield Town were denied entry to the Football League in 1995 after winning the Football Conference after the stadium requirements were tightened. A reciprocal offer by Chester to allow Macclesfield Town to play at the Deva Stadium while the necessary improvements were made was also rejected by the league. Macclesfield Town were champions again two years later, and the ground was now up to the required standards. Macclesfield Town beat Torquay United in their first home league match on 9 August 1997.

Structure and facilities

The ground consists of four stands. The Main stand is on the east side of the pitch and houses home supporters, unless the travelling support is particularly large, in which case the northern end which is terraced houses some away fans. The Star Lane End is to the left (south) of the Main Stand, and is used by the home support. On the west side is the Moss Lane Stand (originally known as the McAlpine stand, named after the contractor that built Huddersfield Town's Kirklees Stadium). This is all-seated and covered, and houses home supporters, and a small number of travelling fans. At the north end is the Silkmen Terrace, an open terrace for away fans. Unfortunately, as Macclesfield is often struck by wet weather, this can make for an uncomfortable spectating experience for visiting fans.

Sale
After Macclesfield Town F.C. was wound up in September 2020, the stadium was listed for sale with offers invited in excess of £500,000, roughly equivalent to the amount owed to the club's creditors.

On 13 October 2020, the Official Receiver confirmed that the assets of Macclesfield Town had been sold to Macc Football Club Limited. Local businessman (and owner of 10th tier Stockport Town) Robert Smethurst had purchased the assets, intending to rebrand the club as Macclesfield Football Club and enter the North West Counties Football League in the 2021–22 campaign. These plans went ahead as scheduled and in their first season Macclesfield secured the North West Counties Premier Division title and promotion to the NPL Division One West.

References

External links

 Moss Rose pictures

Football venues in England
Macclesfield Town F.C.
Chester City F.C. stadiums
Sports venues in Cheshire
Multi-purpose stadiums in the United Kingdom
Macclesfield
Sports venues completed in 1891
English Football League venues